União Desportiva da Tocha is a Portuguese sports club from Tocha.

The men's football team last finished 2nd in the Honra A AF Coimbra of 2019–20. The team was a mainstay in the Terceira Divisão from 2002 to 2012, when it contested the third-tier 2012–13 Segunda Divisão. From there, the team was relegated to the district league. In the Taça de Portugal, Tocha notably reached the fourth round in 2007–08.

References

Football clubs in Portugal
Association football clubs established in 1953
1953 establishments in Portugal